The Classic of Arts was a 3rd-century Chinese book written by Handan Chun on the various cultivated arts of ancient China. The book also briefly discussed some basics of the game of Go, and it was the first to state the 9 Pin Zhi, a system for Go ranks and ratings.

See also 

 International Go Federation

Notes

External links
Go in ancient China by John Fairbairn

Go books
Chinese literature